Róbert Gunnarsson (born 22 May 1980) is an Icelandic handball player who plays for Aarhus Håndbold and the Icelandic national team as a line player. He has competed for Iceland at three Olympic Games, winning a silver medal at the 2008 Summer Olympics.

References

1980 births
Living people
Robert Gunnarsson
Robert Gunnarsson
Handball players at the 2004 Summer Olympics
Handball players at the 2008 Summer Olympics
Handball players at the 2012 Summer Olympics
Robert Gunnarsson
Robert Gunnarsson
Recipients of the Order of the Falcon
Rhein-Neckar Löwen players
VfL Gummersbach players
Olympic medalists in handball
Medalists at the 2008 Summer Olympics
Handball-Bundesliga players
Expatriate handball players
Robert Gunnarsson
Robert Gunnarsson
Robert Gunnarsson